Ilford County High School (often abbreviated to ICHS) is a selective secondary grammar school for boys located in the town of Barkingside of the London Borough of Redbridge. The school was formerly called Park High Grade School and as a result old boys are referred to as Old Parkonians.

ICHS is a six-form entry school, each form comprising up to 30 pupils. Originally one of a number of selective schools in the London Borough of Redbridge, ICHS was retained in 1973 as the only boys’ selective school in the borough. Admission at 11+ takes place through tests administered by the borough as local education authority. There is also opportunity for admission at 16+, directly into the sixth form, but the majority of places each year are taken up by existing students of the lower school.

History 

The school was founded in 1901 in Balfour Road, Ilford as Park Higher Grade School, before moving to its present site on Fremantle Road, Barkingside in 1935. The ground floor of the original building in Balfour Road is today used as an annexe for the adjoining Christchurch Primary School, and the remainder of the building as Redbridge Teachers' Centre.

Although there once existed several selective grammar schools in the area, by 1973 it remained the only boys' selective school in Redbridge. The girls' section split off in 1929 to a new site in Cranbrook Road, where the school was known as Ilford County High School for Girls.  Following the conversion of the girls' school to being part of a co-educational school (Valentines High School), Woodford County High School (WCHS) is now seen as the "sister school". In recent times, it has become the "partner school" of Trinity Catholic High School and Ilford Jewish Primary School.

In 2004/5, there were 843 pupils, including 245 in the sixth form, and 88 members of staff, including 63 teachers. The Headmaster, from 1993, was Mr S I Devereux who retired in December 2009. From January 2010 to 18 April 2010 Mrs Carole Jordan (Deputy Head) became Acting Head Teacher. On 19 April 2010, Mr Michael Capon officially became the new Headmaster of Ilford County High School. He was previously Deputy Headteacher of St Martins School, Brentwood. Mr Capon retired from the school in July 2014 after four years of service to the school. He was succeeded by Mrs Rebecca Drysdale as Acting Head Teacher at first, while her position of Deputy Head was accepted on an acting basis by Mrs Foucher and Mr Streatfield. Mrs Drysdale is the second female acting head teacher in Ilford County High School's history. On 28 April 2015  Mrs Drysdale's appointment to the post was confirmed by the governors as substantive. Mrs Foucher and Mr Streatfield were appointed substantive Deputy Headteachers following interviews held on 12 June 2015.

Old Parkonians
The Old Parkonians Association was founded as an association of former pupils of the Ilford County High School. Today, the association performs a dual role, as "landlord" of the facilities at the Oakfield Playing Fields and parent body for the affiliated Sports Clubs, and as a social hub for former pupils of the School.

The association has two affiliated sports clubs; the Old Parkonians Football Club & the Oakfield Parkonians Cricket Club.

Old Parkonians FC currently has nine senior teams, all of which compete in the Southern Amateur League. In the 2011/12 season OPFC became the first club to simultaneously hold the Senior (1st XI), Junior (2nd XI) and Minor (3rd XI) Old Boys cups.

In Summer 2014 the football club created a youth section called the Young Parkonians Football Club. There are currently Under 13's and Under 16's teams competing in the Echo Junior Football League with plans to add more youth teams in future years.

The Cricket Club, now open to all, still retains strong links with the School, providing coaching during the winter and playing the annual Centenary Trophy match against the School 1st XI each year.  The Cricket Club fields 5 XIs in the Shepherd Neame Essex League, an occasional 6th XI on Saturdays, and teams playing friendlies on Sundays, as well as running a Colts section.

School magazine

Chronicles
The school has published a magazine since its foundation entitled "Chronicles", often showcasing students' poems and artwork, in addition to news. Prior to 2007, Chronicles had always been published in book format and distributed to students throughout the school. However, this was discontinued in 2007, and was replaced by an online-only version.

Focus
"Focus" is a school newspaper written by a group of lower school pupils. The first edition was released in 2010 and all editions are available to view on the school website. The newspaper discusses on-going school issues and other topics of interest to pupils.

STEM 
"STEM" was a termly periodical, formed and edited by a team of sixth form students which published articles on science-orientated subjects. The periodical was distributed during the 2015 academic year and remains available to view on the school website

New facilities 

Construction of a new Sports Hall was completed in November 2006 and was opened by former pupil Sir Trevor Brooking. The Sports Hall provides access to gym equipment, a swimming pool and a large sports hall.

The Learning Resource Centre (Library) also came into action in October.

In 2014, the Sixth Form Suite was constructed, purpose made for KS5 students to use as a learning environment outside of the LRC which is used by all years. The block is constructed in the location of the old Economics and Business class, which has since been housed elsewhere in the school. The Sixth Form Suite also houses the offices for the Head of Sixth Form & Deputy Heads of Sixth Form.

On 1 June 2015 work was started to refurbish the canteen, and the canteen was ready for use for the students by the start of new school year. In August 2015 on the construction of a new science and technology block, with additional sixth form facilities, preparatory to expansion of the main school to six forms of entry commencing with the Year 7 intake in September 2016. Work initially got delayed due to planning permission going through with the sister school, Woodford County High School. In September 2015, construction commenced for the expansion of the school, while the school maintained normal functionality. The new building was finally available to students September 2017, and has been in use ever since.

Notable alumni

Notable ex-pupils include:
Sir Husein Hasanally Abdoolcader (1890–1974), Indian-born Malayan politician
Alan Aldous (1923–1992), Headmaster
Kenneth Allen (1923–1997), Professor of Nuclear Physics, University of Oxford
Laurence Baxter (1954–1996), Professor of Statistics, State University of New York
Raymond Baxter (1922–2006), TV personality (Tomorrow's World)
Sir Michael Berry (b. 1941), Professor of Physics at Bristol University
Reginald Horace Blyth (1898–1964), author and devotee of Japanese culture
Sir Trevor Brooking (b. 1948), Footballer
Gerald Butler (b. 1930, 2010), Judge
Air Vice-Marshal Arthur Button (1916–1991), Director of RAF Education
Marie Coates (1916 – 2004), biologist and food nutrition scientist
Varun Chopra (b. 1987), Essex County Cricket Club, formerly Warwickshire County Cricket Club; England Lions (2013) and former captain of the English U-19 cricket team. 
Roland Dobbs (1924-2016), Professor of Physics, University of London
Robert Demeger (1951-2014), actor (films and television), member of RSC 
William Thomas George Gates (1908–1990), Banker
Jeffrey Alan Gray (1934–2004), Psychologist and Linguist
Brian Green, QC (b. 1956), barrister 
Steven Haberman (b. 1951), Professor of Actuarial Science at City University
Boyd Hilton (b. 1967) TV Editor, Heat Magazine and broadcaster
Ronald Hutton (b. 1954), Professor of History at the University of Bristol
David Ian (b. 1961), Theatre Producer
Norman Lloyd Johnson (1917–2004), Professor of Statistics.
Christopher Kite (1947-1994), Professor of Harpsichord and Fortepiano, Guildhall School of Music and Drama 1977-87, Fellow 1983, Head of Music Studies 1987-94;
Kenneth Lefever, CB (1915–2006), Senior British civil servant.
Kathleen Lonsdale (1903–1971), Chemist, who had studied at the girls' school and transferred to the boys' school at the age of 16 so she could study science.
John Lyall (1940–2006), Former Footballer and West Ham manager
Raymond Lygo (1924-2012), Chief of Naval Staff 1978
Johann Malawana (b. 1979), Doctor and Trade Unionist
John Moloney (b. 1965), Comedian and Writer
Neil Merritt (b. 1939), Law Lecturer; Vice-Chancellor, University of Portsmouth
John Mitchell (b. 1925), Assistant Director General, British Council
Kele Okereke (b. 1981), Singer, Bloc Party
Kenneth Pepper (1913–2002), Commissioner of Her Majesty's Customs and Excise
Raymond Peters (1918–1995), Professor of Polymer and Fibre Science, University of Manchester
John Reddaway (1916–1990), Deputy Head of the United Nations Relief and Works Agency
John Rickard (b. 1940-2013), Government economist
Allen Sheppard (b. 1932), Baron Sheppard of Didgemere, industrialist
Derek Smith (1931-2016), jazz pianist
Charles Stapley (1925-2011), actor
Ralph Stead (1917–2000), Chairman, Eastern Region, British Gas
Bramwell Tovey (b. 1953-2022), Conductor
Geoffrey Tyler (1920-2012), Educationalist

Notable teachers 
ICHS teachers notable in other fields, or who became head of a school, include:

 David Evennett, MP 1983–1997 and 2005–, had his entire teaching career at ICHS, 1972-4

References

External links
Ilford County High School website
Old Parkonians website

Educational institutions established in 1901
Grammar schools in the London Borough of Redbridge
Boys' schools in London
1901 establishments in England
Community schools in the London Borough of Redbridge